Natalie West (born Natalie Neal West; January 23, 1956) is an American television, film and stage actress best known for her role as Crystal Anderson-Conner on the 1988–2018 TV series Roseanne.

Career
West's career began in the early 1980s when she starred in several plays in Chicago area theaters. Her major break came when she won the role of Crystal Anderson Conner, Roseanne's friend and, later, Dan's stepmother, on Roseanne. She was a regular cast member for seasons three and four and a recurring guest star before and afterward. Her final appearance was in the season eight premiere in 1995. Soon after she took a hiatus from film and television to focus on her stage career. She appeared in the 2018 revival of the show. However on May 29, 2018, in the wake of controversial remarks made by Barr on Twitter regarding Valerie Jarrett (an advisor of former president Barack Obama), ABC cancelled the revival after a single season.

In 2004, she acted in the independent film Life Sentence. She later appeared in a few more independent films over the years. In 2012, she starred in her first leading film role in the independent comedy-drama film Nate & Margaret, playing Margaret. She has continued to perform in several Chicago theatre productions including with A Red Orchid Theatre where she is an ensemble member.

Her films include Bushwhacked (1995), Life Sentence (2004)  The Poker House (2007) and Nate & Margaret (2012).

Awards
 1984 – Joseph Jefferson Award for Actress in a Supporting Role in a Play for Life and Limb at the Wisdom Bridge Theatre in Chicago
 2010 – Joseph Jefferson Award for Actress in a Supporting Role in a Play for Abigail's Party at A Red Orchid Theatre in Chicago
 2012 – Equity Joseph Jefferson Award for Actress in a Supporting Role in a Play for The Butcher of Baraboo at A Red Orchid Theatre in Chicago

Filmography

Film

Television

References

External links
 

1956 births
American stage actresses
American television actresses
Actresses from North Dakota
People from Grand Forks, North Dakota
Living people
21st-century American women